Year 166 (CLXVI) was a common year starting on Tuesday (link will display the full calendar) of the Julian calendar. At the time, it was known as the Year of the Consulship of Pudens and Pollio (or, less frequently, year 919 Ab urbe condita). The denomination 166 for this year has been used since the early medieval period, when the Anno Domini calendar era became the prevalent method in Europe for naming years.

Events 
 By place 
 Roman Empire 
 Dacia is invaded by barbarians.
 Conflict erupts on the Danube frontier between Rome and the Germanic tribe of the Marcomanni.  
 Emperor Marcus Aurelius appoints his sons Commodus and Marcus Annius Verus as co-rulers (Caesar), while he and Lucius Verus travel to Germany. 
 End of the war with Parthia: The Parthians leave Armenia and eastern Mesopotamia, which both become Roman protectorates. 
 A plague (possibly small pox) comes from the East and spreads throughout the Roman Empire, lasting for roughly twenty years.
 The Lombards invade Pannonia (modern Hungary). They are quickly dispatched by the Roman Army.

 Asia 
 King Chogo of Baekje succeeds to the throne of Baekje, in the Korean peninsula.
 Scholars who have denounced eunuchs are arrested, killed or banished from the capital and official life in Han Dynasty China. This is the first of the Disasters of the Partisan Prohibitions, which end in 184.
 A Roman envoy arrives by sea in Rinan commandery, in southern China (central Vietnam). He travels to the Chinese capital Luoyang, and is greeted by Emperor Huan of the Han Dynasty.

 By topic 
 Religion 
 Pope Soter succeeds Pope Anicetus as the twelfth pope of Rome.
 Laurence succeeds Alypius as  Patriarch of Constantinople.

Births 
 Taishi Ci (or Ziyi), Chinese general (d. 206)

Deaths 
 Celadion, patriarch of Alexandria
 Gaeru of Baekje, Korean ruler
 Laurence, bishop of Byzantium
 Ma Rong, Chinese poet and politician  (b. AD 79)

References